Bullfighting was banned in the Spanish autonomous community of Catalonia by a vote of the Catalan Parliament in July 2010. The ban came into effect on January 1, 2012. The last bullfight in the region took place on 25 September 2011 at La Monumental. The ban was officially annulled for being unconstitutional by Spain's highest court on October 5, 2016. However, despite the overturning of the ban, no further bullfight had taken place in Catalonia as of July 2020.

Bullfighting in Catalonia

The earliest recorded fight in Catalonia took place in 1387, although, as elsewhere in Spain, it was not until the early 19th century that bullfighting in the region took its form as a modern spectator sport. By the early 20th century, it had become one of the major entertainment attractions in Catalonia. The region still preserves some of the oldest bullrings in Spain, such as the Plaça Clarà in Olot (built in 1859), and the bullring in Figueres (1894). The 1897 bullring in Girona was demolished in 2006.

The sport declined in popularity in recent decades. By 2011, the only operating bullring in Catalonia was La Monumental in Barcelona, where 20 fights were organized in 2009. This compares to 284 fights organized in the Community of Madrid (with a similar population to Catalonia). Nine fights were organized between April and July 2010. Organizers say that average attendance is around 7,000 people, of whom 400 are season ticket holders.

2010 ban

A ban on bullfighting in Catalonia was approved by the Catalan Parliament on 28 July 2010, following a petition (or Popular Legislative Initiative, PLI) organised by the PROU platform (Catalan for 'Enough!'). The petition attracted 180,000 signatures. The parliamentary vote was 68 votes for and 55 against, with 9 abstentions Catalonia became the second autonomous community in Spain to ban bullfighting after the Canary Islands did so in 1991. The ban came into force on 1 January 2012. Bullfights by matadors were banned in Catalonia at the end 2011 but bull-dodging, in which bulls are not killed, remains lawful. The last bullfight in Catalonia took place on 25 September 2011 at La Monumental.
In October 2016 the Catalonian ban on bullfighting was overturned by the Spanish Constitutional Court. The Court ruled that, though an autonomous region is allowed to regulate bullfighting, an autonomous region is not in a legal position to fully ban such fights.

Controversy

The campaign to ban bullfighting in Catalonia was strongly supported by animal rights groups and gained the backing of celebrities including Ricky Gervais and Pamela Anderson. Opponents of the ban suggested that it was not motivated by animal welfare concerns, but by the desire of Catalan nationalists to eradicate from the region something seen as culturally Spanish. The ban did not cover the Catalan tradition of correbous (roughly meaning bulls running by the streets), including its bou embolat version, in which lit flares are attached to the horns of a bull, cited as an inconsistency by both opponents of the ban and animal rights activists.

Popular Legislative Initiative
The approval of the PLI repealed the exception to the second paragraph of Article 6 of the Animal Protection Act: 

And added to the first paragraph:

Votes

References

2010 in Catalonia
Animal welfare and rights in Spain
Catalonia
Bullfighting in Spain
Criticisms of bullfighting